Evgeny Sova (born 29 August 1980) is an Israeli journalist, television presenter and politician who currently serves as a member of the Knesset for Yisrael Beiteinu.

Biography
Born in Pervomaisk in the Ukrainian SSR of the Soviet Union, Sova immigrated to Israel in 1997 as part of the Jewish Agency's Selah Programme and studied for a BA in political science at Bar-Ilan University. In 2005 he joined the Russian-language Vesti newspaper as a reporter and researcher. He later joined Israel Plus as a political commentator, before moving to RTVI in 2014, presenting the Week in Israel programme. He also worked as the BBC Russian-language correspondent in Israel. In addition to his broadcasting work, Sova lectures in journalism at Ariel University.

Prior to the April 2019 Knesset elections he was placed third on the Yisrael Beiteinu list, and entered the Knesset as the party won five seats.

Sova is married with two children and lives in Petah Tikva.

References

External links

1980 births
Living people
Bar-Ilan University alumni
Ukrainian emigrants to Israel
Ukrainian Jews
Israeli journalists
Israeli television presenters
Academic staff of Ariel University
Yisrael Beiteinu politicians
Members of the 21st Knesset (2019)
Members of the 22nd Knesset (2019–2020)
Members of the 23rd Knesset (2020–2021)
Members of the 24th Knesset (2021–2022)
Members of the 25th Knesset (2022–)
Jewish Israeli politicians